Dennis Stallings (born May 25, 1974) is a former American football linebacker. He played for the Tennessee Oilers from 1997 to 1998.

References

1974 births
Living people
American football linebackers
Illinois Fighting Illini football players
Tennessee Oilers players